Melford Nicholas is a Member of Parliament and Cabinet Minister. He is currently the parliamentary representative for St. John's City East. He is a member of the Antigua and Barbuda Labour Party.

Early life 
He was born and raised in St. Johnston, Saint John.

Political career  
He founded the Organisation for National Development, and he first contested in the 2009 general elections, the Organisation for National Development later merged into the Antigua and Barbuda Labour Party.

Nicholas won the St. John's City East seat under the Antigua and Barbuda Labour Party in both the 2014 and 2018 general elections. On 18 June 2014, he was appointed Minister of Information, Broadcasting, Telecommunications, and Information Technology, and still is the Minister as of January 2021.

References 

Living people
Year of birth missing (living people)
Antigua and Barbuda politicians